Saméon is a commune in the Nord department in northern France.

Heraldry

Twinning
Saméon is twinned with Sherington, England.

See also
Communes of the Nord department

References

Communes of Nord (French department)